The coat of arms of South Georgia and the South Sandwich Islands was granted in 1985, upon the creation of the territory. Prior to 1985, South Georgia and the South Sandwich Islands were a dependency of the Falkland Islands, and used their coat of arms. However, prior to 1962, the islands were grouped with what is now the British Antarctic Territory and their coat of arms was used instead of the Falkland Islands’ arms.

The arms consist of a shield containing a golden lion rampant holding a torch, representing the United Kingdom and discovery, together with two golden estoiles from the arms of James Cook who discovered the islands. The background of the shield is blue and white lozenges.  The supporters are an Antarctic fur seal standing on a mountain, and a macaroni penguin standing on ice, both animals native to the islands. The crest is a reindeer, from the two herds of reindeer found on South Georgia Island.

The motto is Leo Terram Propriam Protegat (Latin: “[Let the] Lion protect his own land”).

The coat of arms is used in the fly of the flag of South Georgia and the South Sandwich Islands, and as a crest in the defaced Union Flag of the Civil Commissioner.

See also
 List of coats of arms of the United Kingdom and dependencies

Sources
 Heraldry of the World: South Georgia and the South Sandwich Islands

South Georgia and the South Sandwich Islands
South Georgia and the South Sandwich Islands
South Georgia and the South Sandwich Islands culture
South Georgia and the South Sandwich Islands
South Georgia and the South Sandwich Islands
South Georgia and the South Sandwich Islands
South Georgia and the South Sandwich Islands
South Georgia and the South Sandwich Islands
South Georgia and the South Sandwich Islands
South Georgia